The following is a partial list of the "E" codes for Medical Subject Headings (MeSH), as defined by the United States National Library of Medicine (NLM).

This list continues the information at List of MeSH codes (D27). Codes following these are found at List of MeSH codes (E02). For other MeSH codes, see List of MeSH codes.

The source for this content is the set of 2006 MeSH Trees from the NLM.

– diagnosis

– diagnosis, computer-assisted

– image interpretation, computer-assisted
  – neuronavigation
  – radiographic image interpretation, computer-assisted

– diagnosis, differential

– diagnosis, dual (psychiatry)

– diagnostic errors

– false negative reactions

– false positive reactions

– observer variation

– diagnostic techniques and procedures

– breath tests

– diagnostic imaging
  – image interpretation, computer-assisted
  – neuronavigation
  – radiographic image interpretation, computer-assisted
  – tomography, emission-computed
  – positron-emission tomography
  – tomography, emission-computed, single-photon
  – tomography, x-ray computed
  – colonography, computed tomographic
  – tomography, spiral computed
  – imaging, three-dimensional
  – echocardiography, three-dimensional
  – echocardiography, four-dimensional
  – holography
  – magnetic resonance imaging
  – cholangiopancreatography, magnetic resonance
  – diffusion magnetic resonance imaging
  – echo-planar imaging
  – magnetic resonance angiography
  – magnetic resonance imaging, cine
  – microscopy
  – dermoscopy
  – microscopy, acoustic
  – microscopy, confocal
  – laser scanning cytometry
  – microscopy, electron
  – cryoelectron microscopy
  – electron probe microanalysis
  – microscopy, electron, scanning
  – microscopy, electron, transmission
  – microscopy, electron, scanning transmission
  – microscopy, energy-filtering transmission electron
  – microscopy, immunoelectron
  – microscopy, fluorescence
  – microscopy, fluorescence, multiphoton
  – microscopy, interference
  – microscopy, phase-contrast
  – microscopy, polarization
  – microscopy, scanning probe
  – microscopy, atomic force
  – microscopy, scanning tunneling
  – microscopy, ultraviolet
  – microscopy, video
  – photomicrography
  – photography
  – holography
  – image enhancement
  – radiographic image enhancement
  – angiography, digital subtraction
  – radiography, dental, digital
  – radiography, dual-energy scanned projection
  – tomography, x-ray computed
  – colonography, computed tomographic
  – tomography, spiral computed
  – tomography, emission-computed
  – positron-emission tomography
  – tomography, emission-computed, single-photon
  – photofluorography
  – photogrammetry
  – moire topography
  – photography, dental
  – photomicrography
  – radiography
  – age determination by skeleton
  – angiography
  – angiocardiography
  – angiography, digital subtraction
  – aortography
  – cerebral angiography
  – cineangiography
  – coronary angiography
  – phlebography
  – portography
  – arthrography
  – cineradiography
  – cineangiography
  – densitometry, x-ray
  – electrokymography
  – fluoroscopy
  – photofluorography
  – hysterosalpingography
  – lymphography
  – mammography
  – xeromammography
  – microradiography
  – neuroradiography
  – cerebral angiography
  – cerebral ventriculography
  – echoencephalography
  – ultrasonography, doppler, transcranial
  – myelography
  – pneumoencephalography
  – pneumoradiography
  – pneumoencephalography
  – radiographic image enhancement
  – angiography, digital subtraction
  – radiography, dental, digital
  – radiography, dual-energy scanned projection
  – tomography, x-ray computed
  – colonography, computed tomographic
  – tomography, spiral computed
  – radiographic image interpretation, computer-assisted
  – radiographic magnification
  – radiography, abdominal
  – cholangiography
  – cholangiopancreatography, endoscopic retrograde
  – cholangiopancreatography, magnetic resonance
  – cholecystography
  – defecography
  – portography
  – radiography, dental
  – age determination by teeth
  – radiography, bitewing
  – radiography, dental, digital
  – radiography, panoramic
  – sialography
  – radiography, interventional
  – radiography, thoracic
  – bronchography
  – mass chest x-ray
  – tomography, x-ray
  – tomography, x-ray computed
  – colonography, computed tomographic
  – tomography, spiral computed
  – urography
  – xeroradiography
  – xeromammography
  – radionuclide imaging
  – absorptiometry, photon
  – radioimmunodetection
  – radionuclide angiography
  – radioisotope renography
  – radionuclide ventriculography
  – gated blood-pool imaging
  – ventriculography, first-pass
  – tomography, emission-computed
  – positron-emission tomography
  – tomography, emission-computed, single-photon
  – spectroscopy, near-infrared
  – stroboscopy
  – subtraction technique
  – angiography, digital subtraction
  – radiography, dual-energy scanned projection
  – thermography
  – tomography
  – magnetic resonance imaging
  – cholangiopancreatography, magnetic resonance
  – diffusion magnetic resonance imaging
  – echo-planar imaging
  – magnetic resonance angiography
  – magnetic resonance imaging, cine
  – tomography, emission-computed
  – positron-emission tomography
  – tomography, emission-computed, single-photon
  – tomography, optical
  – tomography, optical coherence
  – tomography, x-ray
  – tomography, x-ray computed
  – tomography, spiral computed
  – transillumination
  – ultrasonography
  – echocardiography
  – echocardiography, doppler
  – echocardiography, doppler, color
  – echocardiography, doppler, pulsed
  – echocardiography, stress
  – echocardiography, three-dimensional
  – echocardiography, four-dimensional
  – echocardiography, transesophageal
  – echoencephalography
  – ultrasonography, doppler, transcranial
  – endosonography
  – microscopy, acoustic
  – ultrasonography, doppler
  – echocardiography, doppler
  – echocardiography, doppler, color
  – echocardiography, doppler, pulsed
  – ultrasonography, doppler, duplex
  – ultrasonography, doppler, color
  – echocardiography, doppler, color
  – ultrasonography, doppler, pulsed
  – echocardiography, doppler, pulsed
  – ultrasonography, doppler, transcranial
  – ultrasonography, interventional
  – ultrasonography, mammary
  – ultrasonography, prenatal
  – nuchal translucency measurement
  – whole body imaging

– diagnostic techniques, cardiovascular
  – angiography
  – angiocardiography
  – angiography, digital subtraction
  – aortography
  – cerebral angiography
  – cineangiography
  – coronary angiography
  – fluorescein angiography
  – magnetic resonance angiography
  – phlebography
  – portography
  – radionuclide angiography
  – radionuclide ventriculography
  – gated blood-pool imaging
  – ventriculography, first-pass
  – angioscopy
  – blood circulation time
  – blood flow velocity
  – blood pressure determination
  – blood pressure monitoring, ambulatory
  – blood volume determination
  – capillary fragility
  – heart function tests
  – angiocardiography
  – ballistocardiography
  – cardiac output
  – stroke volume
  – cardiography, impedance
  – cardiotocography
  – coronary angiography
  – echocardiography
  – echocardiography, doppler
  – echocardiography, doppler, color
  – echocardiography, doppler, pulsed
  – echocardiography, stress
  – echocardiography, three-dimensional
  – echocardiography, four-dimensional
  – echocardiography, transesophageal
  – electrocardiography
  – body surface potential mapping
  – electrocardiography, ambulatory
  – vectorcardiography
  – body surface potential mapping
  – electrophysiologic techniques, cardiac
  – exercise test
  – heart auscultation
  – phonocardiography
  – heart catheterization
  – catheter ablation
  – catheterization, swan-ganz
  – kinetocardiography
  – oximetry
  – blood gas monitoring, transcutaneous
  – pulse
  – radionuclide ventriculography
  – gated blood-pool imaging
  – ventriculography, first-pass
  – valsalva maneuver
  – laser-doppler flowmetry
  – microscopic angioscopy
  – plethysmography
  – photoplethysmography
  – plethysmography, impedance
  – cardiography, impedance
  – tilt-table test

– diagnostic techniques, digestive system
  – cholangiography
  – cholangiopancreatography, endoscopic retrograde
  – cholangiopancreatography, magnetic resonance
  – cholecystography
  – colonography, computed tomographic
  – endoscopy, digestive system
  – cholangiopancreatography, endoscopic retrograde
  – endoscopy, gastrointestinal
  – colonoscopy
  – sigmoidoscopy
  – duodenoscopy
  – gastroscopy
  – proctoscopy
  – esophagoscopy
  – esophageal ph monitoring
  – gastric acidity determination
  – gastrointestinal transit
  – lactose tolerance test
  – liver function tests
  – pancreatic function tests
  – portography
  – sialography

– diagnostic techniques, endocrine
  – adrenal cortex function tests
  – blood glucose self-monitoring
  – glucose tolerance test
  – ovarian function tests
  – pituitary-adrenal function tests
  – pituitary function tests
  – radioligand assay
  – thyroid function tests
  – basal metabolism

– diagnostic techniques, neurological
  – electroencephalography
  – alpha rhythm
  – beta rhythm
  – cortical synchronization
  – delta rhythm
  – theta rhythm
  – magnetoencephalography
  – neurologic examination
  – pain measurement
  – reflex
  – reflex, abdominal
  – reflex, abnormal
  – reflex, babinski
  – reflex, acoustic
  – reflex, pupillary
  – reflex, stretch
  – startle reaction
  – neuroradiography
  – cerebral angiography
  – cerebral ventriculography
  – echoencephalography
  – ultrasonography, doppler, transcranial
  – myelography
  – pneumoencephalography
  – spinal puncture
  – transcranial magnetic stimulation

– diagnostic techniques, obstetrical and gynecological
  – colposcopy
  – culdoscopy
  – fallopian tube patency tests
  – fetal monitoring
  – cardiotocography
  – hysterosalpingography
  – hysteroscopy
  – ovarian function tests
  – ovulation detection
  – ovulation prediction
  – pelvimetry
  – placental function tests
  – pregnancy tests
  – pregnancy tests, immunologic
  – preimplantation diagnosis
  – prenatal diagnosis
  – amniocentesis
  – chorionic villi sampling
  – fetoscopy
  – ultrasonography, prenatal
  – nuchal translucency measurement
  – ultrasonography, mammary
  – uterine monitoring
  – vaginal smears

– diagnostic techniques, ophthalmological
  – corneal topography
  – electroretinography
  – eye movements
  – electronystagmography
  – electrooculography
  – flicker fusion
  – fluorescein angiography
  – fluorophotometry
  – gonioscopy
  – ophthalmodynamometry
  – ophthalmoscopy
  – retinoscopy
  – tonometry, ocular
  – vision tests
  – color perception tests
  – perimetry
  – refraction, ocular
  – vision screening

– diagnostic techniques, otological
  – hearing tests
  – acoustic impedance tests
  – audiometry
  – audiometry, evoked response
  – audiometry, pure-tone
  – audiometry, speech
  – speech discrimination tests
  – speech reception threshold test
  – dichotic listening tests
  – recruitment detection (audiology)
  – otoscopy
  – vestibular function tests
  – caloric tests
  – electronystagmography

– diagnostic techniques, radioisotope
  – radioimmunoassay
  – radioisotope dilution technique
  – radioligand assay
  – radionuclide imaging
  – absorptiometry, photon
  – radioimmunodetection
  – radionuclide angiography
  – radioisotope renography
  – radionuclide ventriculography
  – gated blood-pool imaging
  – ventriculography, first-pass
  – tomography, emission-computed
  – positron-emission tomography
  – tomography, emission-computed, single-photon
  – schilling test

– diagnostic techniques, respiratory system
  – bronchography
  – bronchoscopy
  – laryngoscopy
  – mass chest x-ray
  – mucociliary clearance
  – Nasal provocation test
  – respiratory function tests
  – airway resistance
  – blood gas analysis
  – oximetry
  – blood gas monitoring, transcutaneous
  – bronchial provocation tests
  – capnography
  – exercise test
  – lung compliance
  – lung volume measurements
  – total lung capacity
  – closing volume
  – functional residual capacity
  – expiratory reserve volume
  – residual volume
  – vital capacity
  – expiratory reserve volume
  – inspiratory capacity
  – inspiratory reserve volume
  – tidal volume
  – plethysmography, whole body
  – pulmonary gas exchange
  – pulmonary diffusing capacity
  – ventilation-perfusion ratio
  – pulmonary ventilation
  – forced expiratory flow rates
  – maximal expiratory flow rate
  – maximal expiratory flow-volume curves
  – maximal midexpiratory flow rate
  – peak expiratory flow rate
  – forced expiratory volume
  – maximal voluntary ventilation
  – spirometry
  – bronchospirometry
  – valsalva maneuver
  – work of breathing
  – respiratory sounds
  – rhinomanometry
  – rhinometry, acoustic

– diagnostic techniques, surgical
  – biopsy
  – biopsy, needle
  – biopsy, fine-needle
  – chorionic villi sampling
  – conization
  – sentinel lymph node biopsy
  – endoscopy
  – angioscopy
  – arthroscopy
  – bronchoscopy
  – colposcopy
  – culdoscopy
  – cystoscopy
  – endoscopy, digestive system
  – cholangiopancreatography, endoscopic retrograde
  – endoscopy, gastrointestinal
  – colonoscopy
  – sigmoidoscopy
  – duodenoscopy
  – gastroscopy
  – proctoscopy
  – esophagoscopy
  – fetoscopy
  – hysteroscopy
  – laparoscopy
  – laryngoscopy
  – mediastinoscopy
  – neuroendoscopy
  – thoracoscopy
  – thoracic surgery, video-assisted
  – ureteroscopy
  – video-assisted surgery
  – thoracic surgery, video-assisted
  – pneumomediastinum, diagnostic
  – pneumoperitoneum, artificial

– diagnostic techniques, urological
  – antibody-coated bacteria test, urinary
  – cystoscopy
  – kidney function tests
  – blood urea nitrogen
  – glomerular filtration rate
  – radioisotope renography
  – nephrostomy, percutaneous
  – ureteroscopy
  – urinalysis
  – urinary catheterization
  – urography

– diagnostic tests, routine

– disability evaluation
  – work capacity evaluation

– electrodiagnosis
  – electrocardiography
  – body surface potential mapping
  – electrocardiography, ambulatory
  – vectorcardiography
  – body surface potential mapping
  – electroencephalography
  – alpha rhythm
  – beta rhythm
  – cortical synchronization
  – delta rhythm
  – theta rhythm
  – electrokymography
  – electromyography
  – electronystagmography
  – electrooculography
  – electrophysiologic techniques, cardiac
  – electroretinography
  – plethysmography, impedance

– insufflation

– kymography
  – electrokymography

– mass screening
  – anonymous testing
  – genetic screening
  – mass chest x-ray
  – multiphasic screening
  – neonatal screening

– medical history taking
  – cornell medical index
  – reproductive history

– monitoring, physiologic
  – blood glucose self-monitoring
  – drug monitoring
  – esophageal ph monitoring
  – fetal monitoring
  – cardiotocography
  – monitoring, ambulatory
  – blood pressure monitoring, ambulatory
  – electrocardiography, ambulatory
  – esophageal ph monitoring
  – monitoring, immunologic
  – monitoring, intraoperative
  – polysomnography
  – telemetry
  – uterine monitoring

– myography
  – electromyography

– neoplasm staging

– physical examination
  – anthropometry
  – cephalometry
  – odontometry
  – pelvimetry
  – apgar score
  – auscultation
  – heart auscultation
  – blood pressure determination
  – body constitution
  – body weights and measures
  – body fat distribution
  – adiposity
  – body mass index
  – body size
  – body height
  – body weight
  – birth weight
  – fetal weight
  – overweight
  – obesity
  – obesity, morbid
  – thinness
  – body surface area
  – crown-rump length
  – organ size
  – skinfold thickness
  – waist-hip ratio
  – somatotypes
  – body temperature
  – facial expression
  – facies
  – gait
  – hand strength
  – neurologic examination
  – reflex
  – reflex, abdominal
  – reflex, abnormal
  – reflex, babinski
  – reflex, acoustic
  – reflex, pupillary
  – reflex, stretch
  – startle reaction
  – palpation
  – digital rectal examination
  – percussion
  – pigmentation
  – skin pigmentation
  – pulse
  – range of motion, articular
  – self-examination
  – breast self-examination

– plethysmography
  – photoplethysmography
  – plethysmography, impedance
  – cardiography, impedance
  – plethysmography, whole body

– premarital examinations

– skin tests
  – intradermal tests
  – kveim test
  – skin test end-point titration
  – local lymph node assay
  – passive cutaneous anaphylaxis
  – patch tests
  – tuberculin test

– speech production measurement
  – speech articulation tests

– xenodiagnosis

– early diagnosis

– incidental findings

– laboratory techniques and procedures

– clinical chemistry tests
  – blood chemical analysis
  – blood gas analysis
  – oximetry
  – blood gas monitoring, transcutaneous
  – blood glucose self-monitoring
  – blood protein electrophoresis
  – blood urea nitrogen
  – glucose clamp technique
  – glucose tolerance test
  – lactose tolerance test
  – petrosal sinus sampling
  – enzyme tests
  – esophageal ph monitoring
  – gastric acidity determination
  – limulus test
  – urinalysis

– cytodiagnosis
  – amniocentesis
  – biopsy
  – biopsy, needle
  – biopsy, fine-needle
  – chorionic villi sampling
  – conization
  – sentinel lymph node biopsy
  – chorionic villi sampling
  – cytopathogenic effect, viral
  – spinal puncture
  – vaginal smears

– hematologic tests
  – blood cell count
  – erythrocyte count
  – reticulocyte count
  – leukocyte count
  – lymphocyte count
  – cd4 lymphocyte count
  – cd4-cd8 ratio
  – platelet count
  – blood coagulation tests
  – international normalized ratio
  – partial thromboplastin time
  – prothrombin time
  – thrombelastography
  – thrombin time
  – whole blood coagulation time
  – blood grouping and crossmatching
  – blood sedimentation
  – bone marrow examination
  – erythrocyte aggregation
  – erythrocyte indices
  – figlu test
  – hematocrit
  – hemoglobinometry
  – osmotic fragility
  – platelet function tests
  – bleeding time
  – clot retraction
  – platelet count
  – schilling test

– immunologic tests
  – basophil degranulation test
  – cell migration inhibition
  – cytotoxicity tests, immunologic
  – complement hemolytic activity assay
  – fluorescent antibody technique
  – antibody-coated bacteria test, urinary
  – fluorescent antibody technique, direct
  – fluorescent antibody technique, indirect
  – fluoroimmunoassay
  – fluorescence polarization immunoassay
  – hemolytic plaque technique
  – histocompatibility testing
  – blood grouping and crossmatching
  – lymphocyte culture test, mixed
  – immune adherence reaction
  – immunoassay
  – immunoblotting
  – blotting, western
  – blotting, far-western
  – immunoenzyme techniques
  – enzyme-linked immunosorbent assay
  – enzyme multiplied immunoassay technique
  – immunosorbent techniques
  – enzyme-linked immunosorbent assay
  – radioallergosorbent test
  – radioimmunoprecipitation assay
  – radioimmunosorbent test
  – radioimmunoassay
  – immunoradiometric assay
  – radioallergosorbent test
  – radioimmunoprecipitation assay
  – radioimmunosorbent test
  – leukocyte adherence inhibition test
  – monitoring, immunologic
  – pregnancy tests, immunologic
  – serologic tests
  – agglutination tests
  – hemagglutination tests
  – coombs test
  – latex fixation tests
  – aids serodiagnosis
  – complement fixation tests
  – complement hemolytic activity assay
  – hemadsorption inhibition tests
  – hemagglutination inhibition tests
  – neutralization tests
  – skin test end-point titration
  – precipitin tests
  – flocculation tests
  – immunodiffusion
  – immunoelectrophoresis
  – counterimmunoelectrophoresis
  – immunoelectrophoresis, two-dimensional
  – radioallergosorbent test
  – radioimmunoprecipitation assay
  – syphilis serodiagnosis
  – fluorescent treponemal antibody absorption test
  – treponema immobilization test
  – skin tests
  – intradermal tests
  – kveim test
  – skin test end-point titration
  – local lymph node assay
  – passive cutaneous anaphylaxis
  – patch tests
  – tuberculin test

– metabolic clearance rate

– neonatal screening

– occult blood

– parasite egg count

– pregnancy tests
  – pregnancy tests, immunologic

– radioligand assay

– sex determination (analysis)

– specimen handling
  – biopsy
  – biopsy, needle
  – biopsy, fine-needle
  – chorionic villi sampling
  – conization
  – sentinel lymph node biopsy
  – dissection
  – microdissection
  – preservation, biological
  – cryopreservation
  – freeze drying
  – freeze substitution
  – refrigeration
  – tissue preservation
  – blood preservation
  – organ preservation
  – semen preservation
  – punctures
  – biopsy, needle
  – blood specimen collection
  – cordocentesis
  – petrosal sinus sampling
  – phlebotomy
  – chorionic villi sampling
  – paracentesis
  – pericardiocentesis
  – spinal puncture
  – tissue and organ harvesting
  – vaginal smears

– sperm count

– urinalysis

– prognosis

– disease-free survival

– medical futility

– pregnancy outcome

– treatment outcome
  – treatment failure

The list continues at List of MeSH codes (E02).

E01